Liverpool Data Research Associates (LDRA) is a provider of software analysis, and test and requirements traceability tools for the Public and Private sectors and a pioneer in static and dynamic software analysis.

History
LDRA was founded in 1975 by Professor Michael Hennell to commercialize a software test-bed created to perform quality assessments on the mathematical libraries on which his Nuclear physics research at the University of Liverpool depended.

Products
LDRA Testbed is a proprietary software analysis tool providing static code analysis, and also provides code coverage analysis, code, quality, and design reviews. It is a commercial implementation of the software test-bed created by Hennell as part of his university research.  It was the first commercial product to include support for the Linear Code Sequence and Jump software analysis method, which resulted from the same research. It is used primarily where software is required to be reliable, rugged, and as error free as possible, such as in safety critical aerospace electronics (or Avionics).  It has also been used in the detection and removal of security vulnerabilities. LDRA Testbed is a part of a tool suite from LDRA, including:
TBrun — an automated unit testing tool
TBmanager — a requirements traceability tool
TBevolve — supports software baseline management
TBsafe — supports certification objectives: DO-178C, Def Stan 00-55, IEC 61508
TBpublish — for publishing HTML indexes
TBaudit — for Microsoft Word reports
LDRAcover — coverage tool
LDRArules — standards compliance
TBmisra — LDRArules add-on to apply MISRA C:2012 and other related or similar safety and security rulesets<
Tool Qualification Support Packages — for safety- and security-critical workflows, e.g., DO-178C

Services
In March 2012, LDRA announced a fully compliant FAA/EASA certification solution to provide support and guide certification applicants through a wide range of standards including:
DO-178C(B), DO-278A, DO-254
IEC 62304
ISO 26262
EN 50128
IEC 60880

Industry Standards 
LDRA is a contributor to several industry standards, including DO-178C, MISRA C and MISRA C++. Additionally, LDRA is an Industry Partner for the CERT C Secure Coding Standard produced by the Computer Emergency Response Team at Carnegie Mellon's Software Engineering Institute.

In February 2018, LDRA announced the hiring of Andrew Banks to boost their Standards activities. Banks is the Chairman of both the MISRA C Working Group and of the BSI Software Testing Working Group, and a contributor to a number of national and international standards in the Software Engineering and Functional Safety domains, notably ISO 26262.

References

Companies based in Merseyside
Privately held companies of the United Kingdom
Science and technology in Merseyside
Software companies of the United Kingdom
University of Liverpool